The European Tour 2012/2013 – Event 5 (also known as the 2012 Grant Property Investment.com Scottish Open) was a professional minor-ranking snooker tournament that took place between 13 and 16 December 2012 at the Ravenscraig Sports Facility in Ravenscraig, Scotland. This was the first World Snooker event in Scotland since the 2010 World Open. The event was the fifth of the European Tour 2012/2013

The Scottish Open was last held in 2004, under the Players Championship name. Jimmy White defeated Paul Hunter 9–7 in the final. China's Ding Junhui won the 10th professional title of his career by defeating Scot Anthony McGill 4–2 in the final.

Kurt Maflin made the 96th official maximum break during his last 32 match against Stuart Carrington. This was Maflin's second 147 break and the eighth in the 2012/2013 season.

Prize fund
The breakdown of prize money and ranking points of the event is shown below:

1 Only professional players can earn ranking points.

Main draw 
The following is the results from the event. Players in bold denote match winners.

Preliminary rounds

Round 1 
Best of 7 frames

Round 2 
Best of 7 frames

Main rounds

Top half

Section 1

Section 2

Section 3

Section 4

Bottom half

Section 5

Section 6

Section 7

Section 8

Finals

Century breaks
A total of 35 century breaks were made during the tournament.

 147, 135  Kurt Maflin
 139, 138, 120, 107, 105, 103, 100  Ding Junhui
 137, 137  Fergal O'Brien
 135, 112  Gary Wilson
 134  Ryan Day
 124, 122, 109  Stuart Bingham
 124, 101  Ken Doherty
 120, 107  Luca Brecel
 114  Joe Perry
 113  Martin O'Donnell
 111  Tony Drago
 111  Tian Pengfei
 104  Mark Joyce
 103  Sam Harvey
 102, 102  Mark Davis
 102  Adam Wicheard
 102  Thanawat Thirapongpaiboon
 101  Barry Hawkins
 100  Stuart Carrington
 100  Barry Pinches
 100  Liang Wenbo

References

2012
E5
2012 in Scottish sport
December 2012 sports events in the United Kingdom
Sport in Motherwell